Akim is the title character of an Italian adventure comic series created by  writer Roberto Renzi  and illustrator Augusto Pedrazza.

A Tarzanesque comic book  series, it was published by Tomasina from 1950 to 1967. It was also successfully exported in Germany, Greece (where it was renamed Tarzan)  and in France, where Renzi and Pedrazza kept to produce new stories even after the series closed in Italy. The séries was also successful in Brazil where 198 issues were published between 1971 and 1991. The series was later reprised in Italy in 1976 by publishers Altamira (currently Sergio Bonelli Editore) and Quadrifoglio until 1983, when it finally closed.

References 

Italian comic strips
Italian comics characters
Comics characters introduced in 1950
1950 comics debuts
1967 comics endings
1976 comics debuts
1983 comics endings
Jungle (genre) comics
Jungle men
Jungle superheroes
Fictional feral children
Historical comics